Office of the Chief Executive (CEO) is one of the government agencies for the Hong Kong Special Administrative Region.  It consists of the immediate staff to the Chief Executive of Hong Kong and multiple levels of support staff reporting to the Chief Executive.  The current director is Carol Yip, making her the first woman to hold the office.

History 
Prior to the transfer of sovereignty over Hong Kong, the Government House has always been the office location for the Governor of Hong Kong.  After the transfer in 1997, the first Chief Executive of Hong Kong, Tung Chee Hwa choose not to reside in the Government House, which relocated the office to the Government Secretariat.

When Donald Tsang assumed office in June 2005, he decided to reside in the Government House again and initiated a multiple months length remodeling for the house.  In January 2006, the office relocated back to the Government House.

After the National Security Law was passed, the Chief Executive Office told Apple Daily that it would reveal the list of designated judges for national security cases, but in January 2021, Apple Daily revealed that the Chief Executive Office had broken its promise and cited confidentiality.

In August 2022, after Nancy Pelosi visited Taiwan, John Lee criticized the visit and vowed that "The Hong Kong government would fully support and facilitate all necessary measures by Beijing to safeguard national sovereignty and territorial integrity." After mainland China suspended imports from hundreds of food factories in Taiwan, the Office of the Chief Executive was asked whether Hong Kong would do the same, and the Office said it had nothing to add.

Staff members

Directors 
Political party:

Deputy Director 
Richard Yuen, JP (March 2003 – October 2003)

Permanent Secretary 
Andrew Wong, JP (August 2005– January 2006)
Chang King-yiu, JP (February 2006– October 2007)
Elizabeth Tse, JP (October 2007 – April 2010)
Kenneth Mak, JP (April 2010 – June 2012)
Alice Lau, JP (July 2012 – June 2017)
Jessie Ting, JP (July 2017 – August 2019)
Shirley Lam, JP (September 2019 – June 2022)
Daniel Cheng, JP (July 2022 – Incumbent)

Information Coordinator 
Stephen Lam, GBS, JP (January 1999 – June 2002)
Andy Ho (13 February 2006 – 30 June 2012)
June Tang (1 July 2012 – 31 July 2013)
Andrew Fung (16 December 2013 – 30 June 2017)

Information Coordinator was created by Tung Chee Hwa after the transfer of sovereignty over Hong Kong, prior to the transfer, press release was handle by Information Services Department.

Special Assistant (defunct) 
Gary Chan (2006–2008)
Ronald Chan (2010–2012)

See also 
List of Hong Kong government agencies
Chief Executive's Office (building):Office of the Chief Executive Building

References

External links 
Chief Executive - Office 

Government of Hong Kong